Pansemal Assembly constituency is one of the 230 Vidhan Sabha (Legislative Assembly) constituencies of Madhya Pradesh state in central India.

It is part of Barwani District.
 is a current MLA of Pansemal.

Members of Legislative Assembly

See also
 Pansemal

References

Assembly constituencies of Madhya Pradesh